Hasapi, also written as kacapi, hapitan, and kulcapi, is a two-stringed lute played by the Batak people of the Indonesian island of Sumatra. The plucked instrument was used for Zere religious rituals and is now used as part of the orchestra accompanying the traveling theater Opera Batak.

References

Lute family instruments
Indonesian musical instruments